NGC 15 is a spiral galaxy located in the Pegasus constellation. It was discovered by Albert Marth on October 30, 1864.

References

External links
 
 

Galaxies discovered in 1864
Spiral galaxies
Pegasus (constellation)
0015
00082
000661
18641030